The 2022–23 season is Ludogorets Razgrad's twelfth consecutive season in the Bulgarian First League, of which they are defending champions. This article shows player statistics and all matches (official and friendly) that the club will play during the season.

Squad

Transfers

In

Out

Loans out

Friendlies

Competitions

Overview

First League

Regular stage

Table

Results summary

Results by round

Results

Bulgarian Cup

Bulgarian Supercup

UEFA Champions League

Qualifying rounds

UEFA Europa League

Qualifying rounds

Group stage

UEFA Europa Conference League

Knockout phase

Squad statistics

Appearances and goals

|-
|colspan="18"|Players away from the club on loan:
|-
|colspan="18"|Players who appeared for Ludogorets Razgrad that left during the season:

|}

Goalscorers

Clean sheets

Disciplinary record

References

Ludogorets Razgrad
PFC Ludogorets Razgrad seasons
Ludogorets Razgrad